Danny Koy Lupano (born 23 August 2000) is a Belgian professional footballer who plays as a centre-back for Greek Super League 2 club Kalamata.

Career
At the age of 16, Lupano joined the youth academy of English fifth tier side Solihull Moors. In 2018, he joined the youth academy of Birmingham City in the English second tier. Before the second half of 2018–19, he signed for English seventh tier club Hednesford Town. In 2019, Lupano signed for Hull City in the English second tier after trialing for English Premier League teams Wolverhampton Wanderers and Leicester City. 

Before the 2020 season, he was sent on loan to Derry City in Northern Ireland. In 2020, he was sent on loan to English fifth tier outfit King's Lynn Town. Before the 2021 season, Lupano returned on loan to Derry City in Northern Ireland. In 2021, he signed for Greek side Kalamata. On 16 January 2022, he debuted for Kalamata during a 0–0 draw with Levadiakos.

References

External links
 
 
 Danny Lupano at footballwebpages.co.uk

2000 births
Living people
Footballers from Brussels
Belgian footballers
Association football central defenders
Solihull Moors F.C. players
Birmingham City F.C. players
Hednesford Town F.C. players
Hull City A.F.C. players
Derry City F.C. players
King's Lynn Town F.C. players
Kalamata F.C. players
League of Ireland players
National League (English football) players
Super League Greece 2 players
Belgian expatriate footballers
Belgian expatriate sportspeople in England
Belgian expatriate sportspeople in Ireland
Belgian expatriate sportspeople in Greece
Expatriate footballers in England
Expatriate association footballers in the Republic of Ireland
Expatriate footballers in Greece